MQI may refer to:

 Minhaj-ul-Quran
 Mountain Quest Institute